Paten is a plate used in Christian services or rites.

Patens may also refer to:

Plants
Bulbophyllum patens, a species of orchid
Canna patens, a plant in the family Cannaceae
Delphinium patens, a species of larkspur known by the common names zigzag larkspur and spreading larkspur
Encyclia patens, a species of orchid
Eucalyptus patens, a eucalyptus tree, also known as yarri, blackbutt, Swan River blackbutt and Western Australia blackbutt
Hamelia patens, a plant in the coffee family Rubiaceae
Hedeoma patens, a small herb in the family Lamiaceae, commonly known as oregano chiquito
Ilex patens, a plant in the family Aquifoliaceae endemic to Malaysia
Juncus patens, a species of rush known by the common name spreading rush
Orchis patens, a species of orchid
Penstemon patens, a species of penstemon known by the common name Lone Pine beardtongue
Physcomitrella patens, a moss
Pulsatilla patens, commonly known as Eastern pasqueflower, prairie smoke, prairie crocus or cutleaf anemone 
Salvia patens, a herbaceous perennial, also known as gentian sage or spreading sage
Spartina patens, a cordgrass, also known as salt marsh hay and saltmeadow cordgrass
Verticordia patens,  a woody shrub of Western Australia

Animals
Omoglymmius patens, a species of beetle in the family Rhysodidae
Paratrophon patens, a species of sea snail in the family Muricidae